Arun Manilal Gandhi (born April 14, 1934) is an Indian-American author, socio-political activist and son of Manilal Gandhi, thus a grandson of nationalist leader Mahatma Gandhi. Although he has followed in the footsteps of his grandfather as an activist, he has eschewed the ascetic lifestyle of his grandfather.  In 2017 he published The Gift of Anger:  And Other Lessons From My Grandfather Mahatma Gandhi (New York:  Gallery Books/Jeter Publishing 2017).

Gandhi criticized the Indian government in an article he wrote after they subsidized a 1982 film based on his grandfather's life with $25 million. He immigrated to the United States with his family in 1987 where he studied at the University of Mississippi. They later moved to Memphis, Tennessee, where they founded a nonviolence institute hosted by the Christian Brothers University.

Early life
Arun Manilal Gandhi was born on April 14, 1934, in Durban, to Manilal Gandhi and Sushila Mashruwala. His father was an editor and his mother was a publisher for the Indian Opinion. Arun had seen his grandfather Mahatma Gandhi once briefly at age 5 and didn't see him again until 1946 when he lived with Mahatma Gandhi at the Sevagram ashram in India. Arun returned to South Africa in 1948 just weeks before Mahatma Gandhi was assassinated by Nathuram Godse in the garden of the Birla house mansion, now known as Gandhi Smriti, in New Delhi, India, on Friday January 30, 1948. Godse was captured by career diplomat Herbert Reiner Jr. and sentenced to execution by hanging.

While living at Sevagram, Arun had the advantage of education over the illiterate farm families who worked the surrounding fields. His grandfather urged him to play with the neighboring children after school in order to "learn what it was like to live in poverty", as well as to teach those children what he learned in class each day, which Arun Gandhi later described as "the most creative and enlightening experience for me." Eventually, crowds of children and their parents started showing up for lessons with the young Gandhi, which taught him compassion and the need to share.

Career
In 1982, when Columbia Pictures released the feature film, Gandhi, based on his grandfather's life, Gandhi wrote an article criticizing the Indian government for subsidizing the film with $25 million, arguing that there were more important things to spend such money on. Though his article was widely reprinted and celebrated, after attending a special screening of the film, Gandhi included that it accurately conveyed his grandfather's philosophy and legacy (despite its historical inaccuracies), and was so moved by it that he wrote another article retracting the first one.

In 1987, Arun Gandhi moved to the United States along with his wife, Sunanda, to work on a study at the University of Mississippi. This study examined and contrasted the sorts of prejudices that existed in India, the U.S., and South Africa. Afterward they moved to Memphis, Tennessee and founded the M. K. Gandhi Institute for Nonviolence hosted by the Christian Brothers University, a Catholic academic institution. This institute was dedicated to applying the principles of nonviolence at both local and global scales. As co-founders of the institute, both husband and wife received the Peace Abbey Courage of Conscience Award "for bringing the legacy of Gandhi to America" which was awarded at the John F. Kennedy Library in Boston.  In 1996, he cofounded the Season for Nonviolence as a yearly celebration of the philosophies and lives of Mohandas Gandhi and Martin Luther King Jr.

In 2003 Gandhi was one of the signatories to Humanism and Its Aspirations (Humanist Manifesto III).

In late 2007, Gandhi co-taught a course entitled "Gandhi on Personal Leadership and Nonviolence" at Salisbury University in Salisbury, Maryland. On November 12, 2007, Gandhi gave a lecture for the Salisbury University Center for Conflict Resolution’s “One Person Can Make a Difference” Lecture Series, entitled “Nonviolence in the Age of Terrorism”. In late 2008, Gandhi returned to Salisbury University to co-teach a course entitled "The Global Impact of Gandhi".

In 2007, after the passing of his wife Surnanda on February 21, the institute moved to Rochester, New York, and is currently located on the University of Rochester River Campus. After a January 2008 op-ed in The Washington Post'''s "On Faith" section where Gandhi said that Israelis talked too much about the Holocaust and were losing world sympathy and that Israel and the U.S. were the biggest contributors to the world-threatening "culture of violence", his ties to Rochester were imperiled. He claimed that dwelling on the past wouldn't allow them to move forward. Gandhi apologized by saying he had only meant to say right-wing Likud supporters were part of the problem, but the University did not accept his explanation and informed him that the institute would be closed unless he resigned from it. Gandhi quit soon after and is no longer formally involved in the Institute.

Gandhi has given many speeches about nonviolence in many countries. During his tour to Israel, he urged the Palestinians to resist Israeli occupation peacefully to assure their freedom. In August 2004, Gandhi proposed to the Palestinian Parliament a peaceful march of 50,000 refugees across the Jordan River to return to their homeland, and said MPs should lead the way. Gandhi also claimed that the fate of Palestinians is ten times worse than that of blacks in South African Apartheid. He asked: "What would happen? Maybe the Israeli army would shoot and kill several. They may kill 100. They may kill 200 men, women and children. And that would shock the world. The world will get up and say, 'What is going on?'."

On October 12, 2009 Gandhi visited the Brunton Theatre in Musselburgh to talk to P7's from all over Eastlothian in Scotland. On November 11, 2009 Gandhi visited Chattanooga State Technical Community College in Chattanooga, Tennessee to speak and spread his message of peace. On November 13, 2009 Gandhi visited Cleveland State Community College in Cleveland, Tennessee to speak and spread his message of peace. On November 16, 2010 Gandhi visited The University of Wyoming in Laramie, Wyoming to speak and spread his message of peace.

On March 2, 2011, Arun Gandhi spoke at the East West Center on the campus of the University of Hawaii at Manoa, Honolulu, Hawaii. He spoke about Nonviolence: A Means for Social Change. On the same day he also spoke at Iolani School in Honolulu, on the subject of The Wisdom of Choosing Peace. On March 3, 2011, Gandhi spoke at the University of Hawaii Architecture Building, in an event sponsored by the Spark Matsunaga Institute for Peace and Conflict Resolution in Honolulu, Hawaii. On March 4, 2011 spoke at the Pacific Buddhist Academy in Honolulu, Hawaii. He also spoke at the Hawaii State Capitol (public auditorium) on the subject of "The Power of Peace to Create a Culture of Human Rights in Hawaii and the World." This was part of the Human Rights Week, sponsored by the State of Hawaii. He also spoke at the Pioneer Plaza Club in downtown Honolulu on the subject of "Gandhian Peace (Nonviolence) A Pathway for Resolving Modern Day Conflict." On March 5, 2011 Gandhi visited The International Society for Krishna Consciousness Temple in Honolulu, Hawaii to speak and spread his message of peace. He also spoke at To Ho No Hikari Church in Honolulu, in an event sponsored by Dr. Terry Shintani, on the subject of "The Way of Nonviolence Towards All Living Beings", and at the Hawaii Convention Center as part of the PAAAC Youth Conference. On March 6, 2011 Gandhi spoke at Unity Church, Diamond Head, Honolulu on the subject of "Lessons I Learned With My Grandfather".

Gandhi's 2011 tour of Honolulu was sponsored by Barbara Altemus of the We Are One Foundation and by the Gandhian International Institute for Peace. Gandhi is featured in "THE CALLING: Heal Ourselves Heal our Planet" a Documentary Film in Production created by Barbara Altemus, directed by Oscar-nominated William Gazecki.

On March 23, 2012, Gandhi was the keynote speaker at the first annual Engaging Peace Conference at Arcadia University in Glenside, Pennsylvania.

In March 2014, Atheneum Books for Young Readers published Grandfather Gandhi, a children's book that Arun Gandhi co-authored with Bethany Hegedus, and illustrated by Evan Turk. The picture book memoir, which carries a pro-peace message, tells the story of how Arun's grandfather, likening anger to lightning that could either destroy or illuminate, taught Arun to respond to injustice using peaceful methods, in order to "turn darkness into light". The book also focuses on how Arun, jealous of the other people who commanded his grandfather's attention, frustrated with his schoolwork, and embarrassed at his inability to control his anger, struggled strove to make his grandfather proud. The book was met with positive reviews for its use of a child's point of view in order to make a complex historical issue understandable to child readers, and for Turk's use of cut-paper abstract images to create illustrations with emotional resonance.Smith, Robin (November 4, 2014). "Grandfather Gandhi". The Horn Book Magazine. He also published Legacy of Love: My Education in the Path of Nonviolence''.

Personal life
Gandhi considers himself to be a Hindu but expresses universalist views. Gandhi has worked closely with Christian priests and his philosophies are strongly influenced by Buddhist, Hindu, Muslim and Christian concepts. Like his grandfather, he also believes in the concept of 'non-violence' (Ahimsa). Gandhi claims to be more Unitarian then anything else. He took his prayers public and does not practice Hinduism in the traditional sense.

Gandhi met nurse Surnanda in a hospital and they married 1957. The couple had 2 children, Tushar, born on January 17, 1960, and Archana. Gandhi and Surnanda stayed married until her death on February 21, 2007.

As of 2016, Gandhi resides in Rochester, New York.

See also
List of peace activists

References

External links

 Official Arun Gandhi Blog & Contact Site
 Arun Gandhi Philanthropic Tours
 Gandhi Worldwide Education Institute (Arun Gandhi President)
 M.K. Gandhi institute (Founded by Arun Gandhi)

Living people
20th-century Indian philosophers
American people of Gujarati descent
Nonviolence advocates
American Hindus
South African emigrants to the United States
Arun
South African people of Indian descent
American male writers of Indian descent
21st-century Indian novelists
South African people of Gujarati descent
Indian children's writers
21st-century Indian biographers
1934 births
Gandhians